Vinod Kumar Singh may refer to:

 Vinod Kumar Singh (Bagodar politician) (born 1976), Indian politician
 Vinod Kumar Singh (Gonda Politician)  (1964–2021), Indian politician